Horst Böhme, born Johann Friedrich Horst Böhme (30 May 1908 in Bernau bei Berlin – 27 July 1996 in Arolsen)  was a German chemist. He became an expert on mustard gas. During the war, he worked from 1943 at the Kaiser Wilhelm Institute for Physical Chemistry and Electrochemistry at Berlin-Dahlem. After the war, he became a professor of chemistry and a rector of the University of Marburg.

Literature
 Horst Böhme: Lehr- und Entwicklungsjahre eines Pharmazeuten in Berlin und München, (2 Teile), Deutsche Apotheker-Zeitung, 1989, 129, 2707–2712 und 2832–2840.
 Christoph Friedrich: Wissenschaftliche Schulen und die Marburger Pharmazie, Pharmazeutische Zeitung 2001, 146,  2410–2418.
 Klaus Hartke: Professor Dr. Dr. h. c. H. Böhme, Marburg, 65 Jahre, Deutsche Apotheker-Zeitung 1973, 113, 811.
 Gunther Seitz: Professor Dr. Dr. h.c. Horst Böhme, Marburg, zum 70. Geburtstag Pharmazeutische Zeitung  1978, 123,  948.
 Bernhard Unterhalt: Horst Böhme 75 Jahre, Deutsche Apotheker-Zeitung 1983, 123, 1031–1034 (mit Bibliographie).
 Christoph Friedrich: Horst Böhme – ein bedeutender pharmazeutischer Chemiker, Pharmazeutische Zeitung 2008, 153, 88−90.

20th-century German chemists
1908 births
1996 deaths
Knights Commander of the Order of Merit of the Federal Republic of Germany
People from Barnim
Academic staff of the University of Marburg